is a Japanese politician of the Democratic Party of Japan, a member of the House of Councillors in the Diet (national legislature). A native of Tokushima, Tokushima and graduate of Utsunomiya University, he had served in the city assembly of Utsunomiya, Tochigi for two terms since 1979 and then in the assembly of Tochigi Prefecture for four terms since 1987. He was elected to the House of Councillors for the first time in 2001.

References

External links 
 Official website in Japanese.

Members of the House of Councillors (Japan)
Living people
1943 births
Democratic Party of Japan politicians
People from Tokushima (city)
Members of the Tochigi Prefectural Assembly
Japanese municipal councilors
Politicians from Tochigi Prefecture